Raul Rojas (November 5, 1941 – May 20, 2012) was an American featherweight boxer. He accumulated a record of 38 wins (24 by KO), 7 losses and 2 draws. On March 28, 1968, Rojas defeated Enrique Higgins to win the WBA Featherweight Title, which Vicente Saldivar had vacated after announcing his retirement. He lost the title on September 27, 1968 to Shozo Saijo. Rojas was inducted into the California Boxing Hall of Fame.

Rojas who was of Mexican descent grew up as a gangster, leading the group "Little Roy's Gang". Two of his brothers were sent to San Quentin State Prison, while Rojas spent time at the California Division of Juvenile Justice. He once said that "If it were not for boxing, I'd probably either be in San Quentin or would already have made the trip to the gas chamber." He died of natural causes at the age of 70. He was survived by daughters Rebecca and Guadalupe.

References

External links

 

American boxers of Mexican descent
World Boxing Association champions
World featherweight boxing champions
2012 deaths
1941 births
American male boxers
People from San Pablo, California